Parliamentary elections were held in the Kingdom of Serbs, Croats and Slovenes on 18 March 1923. The seats were divided up by the political borders which existed before the Kingdom's formation and distributed using the population statistics of 1910.

According to a TIME Magazine article published in the next week of the election, the poll was marred by voter intimidation by the military police, suppression of the opposition and the disenfranchisement of ethnic minorities like the Hungarians and the Turks.

After the elections, an opposition Federalist Bloc was formed from the Croatian Republican Peasant Party, Slovenian People's Party and Yugoslav Muslim Organization.

Results

Elected representatives
Mihailo Ivanović - Montenegrin Federalist Party
Risto Popović - Montenegrin Federalist Party
Vranje Sudarević - Bunjevac-Šokac Party
Blaško Rajić - Bunjevac-Šokac Party
Ivan Evetović - Bunjevac-Šokac Party

Modruš-Rijeka electoral district with Krk and Kastav
Croatian Peasant Party - 5 representatives
Srđan Budisavljević - Democratic Party

Požega electoral district
Dragutin Kovačević - Croatian Peasant Party
Ante Adžija - Croatian Peasant Party
Ilija Martinović - Croatian Peasant Party
Ivo Čaldarević - Croatian Peasant Party
Stjepan Klaić - Croatian Peasant Party
Nikola Ovanin - Croatian Peasant Party
Joco Trifunović - Democratic Party

Šibenik-Zadar electoral district
Ljubo Jovanović - People's Radical Party
Nikola Novaković - People's Radical Party
Uroš Desnica - People's Radical Party
Mate Goreta  - Croatian Peasant Party
Mate Drinković  - Croatian Peasant Party

Syrmia electoral district
Croatian Peasant Party - 5 representatives
Bogdan Milašinović - People's Radical Party
Dušan Marković - People's Radical Party
Milan Nedeljković - People's Radical Party 
Vojislav Janjić - People's Radical Party
Svetislav Popović - Democratic Party

Kotor-Dubrovnik-Split electoral district
Croatian Peasant Party - 7 representatives
People's Radical Party - 2 representatives
Democratic Party - 1 representative

Varaždin electoral district with Međimurje
Croatian Peasant Party - 9 representatives
Hinko Krizman - Democratic Party

Virovitica electoral district
Croatian Peasant Party - 6 representatives
Jovan Kockar - People's Radical Party

Zagreb electoral district
Croatian Peasant Party - 10 representatives
Valerijana Pribićević - Democratic Party
Edo Lukinić - Democratic Party
Dušan Peleš - People's Radical Party

City of Zagreb electoral district
Juraj Krnjević - Croatian Peasant Party
Vinko Trnjar - Croatian Peasant Party

References

External links
Između demokrata i radikala - produbljivanje političkih podela među Srbima u Hrvatskoj i parlamentarni izbori 1923
Studia croatica THE ELECTIONS OF 1923 IN THE KINGDOM OF THE SERBS, CROATS, AND SLOVENES
Nebojša A. Popović Srpske parlamentarne stranke u Kraljevini SHS 1918-1929

Yugoslavia
Parliamentary election
Elections in Yugoslavia
March 1923 events
Election and referendum articles with incomplete results